Mr Funtoosh is a 2008 Bengali film directed by Raj Mukherjee, the movie featured Prasenjit, Rachana Banerjee, Seemran.

Plot
Palash (Prasenjit), an engineer who returns to his bustee home and slum-mates, who lose no time in jumping and jiving with baltis and jharu to welcome their guru back. Schoolteacher Rachana Banerjee bursts on the scene as the right match for Palash. But just when the lovey-dovey couple begins cavorting around trees, the bad guys surface. A vile landshark (Hara Pattanaik) tricks Palash into a real-estate project, only to gun him down soon after. For those who love Prosenjit as a deadly combo of action hero and comic man, enter Mr Fantoosh in Jackie Chan mode, spinning karate chops and one-liners that go: "Aami maari ekdin, byatha thakey teensho poyshotti din!” Ha-ha and dhishum-dhishum go hand in hand for Mr Fantoosh of the spiky hair and body-hugging ganjees. Newcomers Malabika (as Prosenjit's sister) and Angshuman (as the villain's son)

Cast
Prasenjit
Rachana Banerjee
Malanika
Angsuman 
Hara Pattanaik

References

External links
 www.gomolo.in
www.telegraphindia.com review

2008 films
2000s Bengali-language films
Bengali-language Indian films